In mathematical logic, an abstract logic is a formal system consisting of a class of sentences and a satisfaction relation with specific properties related to occurrence, expansion, isomorphism, renaming and quantification.

Based on Lindström's characterization, first-order logic is, up to equivalence, the only abstract logic that is countably compact and has Löwenheim number ω.

See also

References

Mathematical logic